Lucas Feltes Engel (born 1 December 1981) is a Brazilian former professional tennis player.

A native of Novo Hamburgo, Engel competed in ATP Challenger and ITF Futures events, reaching a career high singles ranking of 297 in the world. He won six Futures singles titles and was a semi-finalist at the 2006 Joinville Challenger, with wins over Ricardo Mello and André Sá. In doubles, Engel was ranked as high as 207 and won the 2007 Florianópolis Challenger, along with 10 Futures tournaments.

In 2020 it was revealed that Engel was undergoing chemotherapy for non-Hodgkin's lymphoma.

Engel's younger brother, Thomás, was a promising junior tennis player who in 2001, at the age of 16, was killed in a police shooting. He was being searched by police at the time and was on his back when he was fired upon. A police lieutenant was convicted of murder.

ITF Futures titles

Singles: (6)

Doubles: (11)

References

External links
 
 

1981 births
Living people
Brazilian male tennis players
People from Novo Hamburgo
Sportspeople from Rio Grande do Sul
21st-century Brazilian people
20th-century Brazilian people